General Airey may refer to:

George Airey (1761–1833), British Army lieutenant general
James Talbot Airey (1812–1898), British Army general
Terence Airey (1900–1983), British Army lieutenant general
Richard Airey, 1st Baron Airey (1803–1881), British Army general

See also
Christopher Airy (born 1934), British Army major general
Ved Prakash Airy (1935–2007), Indian Army lieutenant general